Christ the King Cathedral is a cathedral of the Roman Catholic Church in the United States. It is located at 4011 54th Street (at the intersection of Orlando & 54th) in Lubbock, Texas. It was constructed first as a school in 1958 and became a parish entity on January 1, 1961, with the completion of the church itself. When it was built it was surrounded by cotton fields, but is now surrounded by much of the city. On June 17, 1984, Pope John Paul II appointed it the seat of the newly created Diocese of Lubbock with the ordination of Bishop Michael J. Sheehan. As of 2007, its presiding bishop is Bishop Robert Coerver. Its school, which started out as 1st–3rd grade, has grown to serve pre-kindergarten through 12th grade.

See also
List of Catholic cathedrals in the United States
List of cathedrals in the United States

References
The Roman Catholic Diocese of Lubbock: History of the Diocese
The History of Christ the King Cathedral

External links

Official Cathedral Site
Diocese of Lubbock Official Site
Official school website

Christ the King Lubbock
Buildings and structures in Lubbock, Texas
Christian organizations established in 1961
Roman Catholic churches completed in 1968
1961 establishments in Texas
Modernist architecture in Texas
20th-century Roman Catholic church buildings in the United States